Saving The Titanic, aired in Germany as Die Helden der Titanic, is 2012 Irish-German television docudrama directed by Maurice Sweeney, and written by Colin Heber-Percy and Lyall Watson. Unlike most films and series depicting the ship's passengers and senior crew, Saving the Titanic dramatizes the engineers and the boiler room crew who kept the furnaces and generators running as the Titanic sank, facilitating the survival of others.

"Based on eyewitness accounts, this is the remarkable story of nine men from the engineering crew who fought courageously to hold back the power of the sea and keep the power systems running, even when they learned that all was lost. The engineering crew consisted of fireman and stokers, who shoveled coal into the ship’s 29 boilers that powered its two massive steam engines, and engineers who made sure the engines and other mechanical equipment functioned smoothly. A memorial to commemorate their bravery was erected in Liverpool, England and unveiled in 1916."

Cast
Liam Cunningham - Narrator
David Wilmot - Chief Engineer, Joseph Bell
Ciarán McMenamin - Leading Fireman, Frederick "Fred" Barrett
Owen McDonnell - Trimmer, Thomas Patrick "Paddy" Dillion
Hugh O'Conor - Junior Assistant Second Engineer, Jonathan Shepherd
Andrew Simpson - Assistant Electrician, Albert George Ervine
John Byrne - Assistant Electrician, Alfred Pirrie Middleton
Chris Newman - Assistant Electrician, William Kelly
Paul Kennedy - Junior Assistant Second Engineer, Hubert Harvey
Douglas Rankine - Greaser, Alfred White
Stephen Hogan - Thomas Andrews
Conor MacNeill - Frank Bell
Ciaran O'Grady - Leading Fireman
Owen Roe - White Star Lawyer
David Heap - White Star Official
Dermot Magennis - Tailor
Johnny Eveson - 2nd Officer
Helen O'Reilly - Female Passenger

External links
 Saving The Titanic at the IMDb database

References

2012 television films
2012 films
Works about RMS Titanic
Films about RMS Titanic
Irish drama films
Films set in 1912
Films directed by Maurice Sweeney
Films scored by Louis Febre